Sarah Einstein (born 30 November 1965) is an American essayist and writer of memoir and literary nonfiction. She is a recipient of the Association of Writers & Writing Programs Award for Creative Nonfiction, and the Pushcart Prize.

Early life 
Sarah Einstein was born in Huntington, West Virginia in 1965. She started writing in her twenties, after attending a writing workshop with Kevin Oderman.

Education 
Einstein earned a Master of Fine Arts in creative writing at  West Virginia University in 2011. Einstein earned her PhD in Creative Nonfiction in 2014 from Ohio University. She studied under Dinty W. Moore.

Career 
Einstein is currently an assistant professor of Creative Writing at the University of Tennessee at Chattanooga.

Einstein's essays have appeared in The Sun, Ninth Letter, Pank Magazine, Fringe, Quiddy, and Hawai’i Pacific Review, among other literary journals. She is the fiction editor at Stirring: A Literary Collective and co-author, with Dominik Henrici, of Writers for Dinner.

Awards
In 2011, she received a Best of the Net Award. That same year, she also received a Pushcart Prize. In 2014, Einstein received the Association of Writers & Writing Programs Award for Creative Nonfiction.

Works

Non-fiction books

Essays

<

Short stories

References

External links
 Writers for Dinner
 Brevity
 Author Website

1965 births
Living people
American essayists
American memoirists
University of Tennessee at Chattanooga faculty
Writers from Huntington, West Virginia
West Virginia University alumni